The Mistral G-300 is a Swiss aircraft engine designed and produced by Mistral Engines of Geneva for use in light aircraft.

Design and development
The engine is a three-rotor, 3X3X displacement, liquid-cooled, gasoline Wankel engine design, with a mechanical gearbox reduction drive. It employs dual electronic ignition systems and produces  at 2250 rpm.

Applications
 Seaflight Shearwater

Specifications (G-300)

See also

References

External links
 

Mistral aircraft engines
Pistonless rotary engine